Polychrysia aurata is a moth of the family Noctuidae. It is found in the Japan, Russia (including Siberia) and recently also China.

The wingspan is 33–37 mm.

References

External links
Images

Plusiinae
Moths of Japan